Peter Loughran (born 3 December 1940) is  a former Australian rules footballer who played with Richmond in the Victorian Football League (VFL).

See also
Lena Headey#Personal life, Heady was married to musician Peter Loughran

Notes

External links 
		

Living people
1940 births
Australian rules footballers from Victoria (Australia)
Richmond Football Club players